Marksboro is an unincorporated community and census-designated place (CDP) located within Frelinghuysen Township in Warren County, New Jersey, United States, that was created as part of the 2010 United States Census, though settlement and naming of the community date back to before 1760. As of the 2010 Census, the CDP's population was 82.

History
Marksboro is named for Colonel Mark Thompson, who built and owned a grist mill on the Paulins Kill here before 1760.  The first store was owned by William Shafer. An academy (school) was built here but was not successful, and was then used as a hotel as early as 1810. In 1814, the Marksboro Presbyterian Church was organized.

By 1882, the population had grown to 175.  Marksboro had a post office, grist and lumber mill, and a "good local trade".

Geography
According to the United States Census Bureau, the CDP had a total area of 0.324 square miles (0.837 km2), including 0.320 square miles (0.828 km2) of land and 0.004 square miles (0.009 km2) of water (1.08%).

Demographics

Census 2010

References

Census-designated places in Warren County, New Jersey
Frelinghuysen Township, New Jersey